Astrothelium pallidoflavum is a species of corticolous (bark-dwelling) lichen in the family Trypetheliaceae. Found in Bolivia, it was formally described as a new species in 2016 by lichenologists Adam Flakus and André Aptroot. It is only known to occur at the type locality. The species epithet refers to the characteristic pale yellow colour of the pseudostromata. Astrothelium pallidoflavum is similar to A. cinnamomeum, but has larger ascospores (27–30 by 10–12 μm) than that species.

References

pallidoflavum
Lichen species
Lichens described in 2016
Lichens of Bolivia
Taxa named by André Aptroot
Taxa named by Adam Grzegorz Flakus